Inscriptional Parthian is a script used to write Parthian language on coins of Parthia from the time of Arsaces I of Parthia (250 BC). It was also used for inscriptions of Parthian (mostly on clay fragments) and later Sassanian periods (mostly on official inscriptions).

Inscriptional Parthian script is written from right to left and the letters are not joined.

Letters
Inscriptional Parthian uses 22 letters:

Ligatures
Inscriptional Parthian uses seven standard ligatures:

The letters sadhe (𐭑) and nun (𐭍) have swash tails which typically trail under the following letter.  For example:

Numbers
Inscriptional Parthian had its own numerals:

Numbers are written right-to-left.  Numbers without corresponding numerals are additive.  For example, 158 is written as ‎ (100 + 20 + 20 + 10 + 4 + 4).

Unicode

Inscriptional Parthian script was added to the Unicode Standard in October, 2009 with the release of version 5.2.

The Unicode block for Inscriptional Parthian is U+10B40–U+10B5F:

References

Abjad writing systems
Iranian inscriptions
Parthian language
Obsolete writing systems
Persian scripts